KRBI-FM (105.5 FM, "River 105") is an American radio station licensed to serve the community of St. Peter, Minnesota and broadcasting to the Mankato area and the Minnesota River Valley. It currently airs a classic hits music format.

The station is owned by Alpha Media, LLC, along with KEEZ, KYSM-FM and KMKO-FM.

From 1966 until 2000, KRBI-FM simulcast with its AM sister at 1310 AM. In later years, the FM station aired an adult contemporary format, with a heavy focus on its hometown of St. Peter. After increasing power from 3,000 to 25,000 watts, improving its signal into Mankato and other nearby cities, KRBI-FM flipped to a more regionally focused classic rock format as "River 105" on September 12, 2000. The St. Peter-oriented programming shifted to its AM sister, KRBI 1310 AM.

KRBI-FM switched its moniker to "The Buzzard" in April 2006.

On January 4, 2010, KRBI-FM changed their format to classic hits, branded as "105.5 The River".

On May 1, 2012 KRBI-FM changed their format from classic hits to adult contemporary, still branded as "105.5 The River".

As of 2018 KRBI-FM has flipped back to classic hits, the station slightly rebranded as "River 105".

References

External links

Radio stations in Minnesota
Classic hits radio stations in the United States
Radio stations established in 1966
1966 establishments in Minnesota